László Szalay (13 December 1914 – 15 April 2008) was a Hungarian alpine skier who competed in the 1936 Winter Olympics.

References

1914 births
2008 deaths
Hungarian male alpine skiers
Hungarian male Nordic combined skiers
Olympic alpine skiers of Hungary
Olympic Nordic combined skiers of Hungary
Alpine skiers at the 1936 Winter Olympics
Nordic combined skiers at the 1936 Winter Olympics